This article details the Catalans Dragons rugby league football club's 2012 season. This is their 7th season in the Super League.

Table

Milestones

Round 1: Louis Anderson and Ben Fisher made their debuts for the Dragons.
Round 1: Cyrille Gossard made his 50th appearance for the Dragons.
Round 1: Scott Dureau kicked his 100th goal for the Dragons.
Round 3: Leon Pryce made his debut for the Dragons.
Round 6: Leon Pryce scored his 1st try for the Dragons.
Round 7: Damien Blanch scored his 25th try and reached 100 points for the Dragons.
Round 8: Grégory Mounis scored his 25th try for the Dragons.
Round 8: Scott Dureau reached 300 points for the Dragons.
Round 9: Damien Cardace made his debut for the Dragons.
Round 9: Damien Cardace scored his 1st try for the Dragons.
Round 9: Damien Cardace scored his 1st four-try haul and 1st hat-trick for the Dragons.
Round 9: Clint Greenshields scored his 3rd hat-trick for the Dragons.
Round 9: Louis Anderson scored his 1st try for the Dragons.
Round 9: Vincent Duport scored his 25th try and reached 100 points for the Dragons.
Round 9: Daryl Millard kicked his 1st goal for the Dragons.
CCR5: Damien Cardace scored his 2nd hat-trick for the Dragons.
CCQF: Ben Fisher scored his 1st try for the Dragons.
Round 14: Scott Dureau reached 400 points for the Dragons.

Fixtures and results

2012 Super League

Super League Play-offs

Player appearances
Super League only

 = Injured

 = Suspended

Challenge Cup

Player appearances
Challenge Cup games only

 = Injured

 = Suspended

Squad statistics

 Appearances and Points include (Super League, Challenge Cup and play-offs) as of 27 May 2012.

Transfers

In

Out

References

2012 in rugby league by club
2012 in English rugby league
Catalans Dragons seasons